Sicyopus cebuensis is a species of fish that was first documented by Chen and Shao in 1998, who documented just a single adult pair located in the Uling brook within the upper Naga River basin on the island of Cebu, Cebu province, the Philippines.

The species appears to prefer clear mountain streams.

Since the original identification and documentation, a single adult male has been spotted also on the island of Cebu by tour guide Larry Honoridiz and wildlife biologist Robert Drew Adams around the Kawasan Falls in Badian, Central Visayas.

References 

cebuensis
Freshwater fish of the Philippines
Fish described in 1998